King Willem may refer to various kings of the Netherlands:

 Willem I of the Netherlands, King from 1815 to 1840
 Willem II of the Netherlands, King from 1840 to 1849
 Willem III of the Netherlands, King from 1849 to 1890
 Willem-Alexander of the Netherlands, current King whose reign started in 2013